Next Star is a Swedish singing reality competition television series for youths between the age of 13–19. The series was developed in 2007 by ICA Maxi in cooperation with Diggiloo, and aired between 2008 and 2010. The winner of the contest would perform at the Diggiloo summer tour all over Sweden. The winner is decided by a jury and also by votes from the Swedish people. The surplus of the voting would go to the World Childhood Foundation. Next Star has brought in 1.2 million (SEK) to the foundation.

Winners

Next Star 2008

Finalists & Result

(*) The 9 remaining finalists shares the fourth place.

Next Star 2009

Finalists & Result

(*) The 7 remaining finalists shares the fourth place.

Next Star 2010

Finalists

(*) The 7 remaining finalists shares the fourth place.

External links
Next Star
World Childhood Foundation

Singing talent shows
Music competitions in Sweden
Television series about teenagers